The Wyndham Sisters: Lady Elcho, Mrs. Adeane, and Mrs. Tennant is an 1899 painting by John Singer Sargent. It is part of the collection of the Metropolitan Museum of Art. The painting was hailed by the critics and dubbed “The Three Graces” by the Prince of Wales (later King Edward VII).

Painting
The three daughters of the Honourable Percy Wyndham, a British politician and younger son of George Wyndham, 1st Baron Leconfield, appear in this monumental canvas. From the left, they are Madeline Adeane (1869–1941), Pamela Tennant (1871–1928), and Lady Elcho (1862–1937).

Sargent painted them in the drawing room of their family's residence on Belgrave Square. Seen on the wall above them is George Frederic Watts’s portrait of their mother, establishing their genealogy and reminding viewers of Sargent's ties to older artists.

See also
 1899 in art

References

1899 paintings
19th-century portraits
Group portraits by American artists
Paintings by John Singer Sargent
Paintings in the collection of the Metropolitan Museum of Art
Portraits of women